MT Framework is a game engine created by Capcom. "MT" stands for "Multi-Thread", "Meta Tools" and "Multi-Target". While initially MT Framework was intended to power 2006's Dead Rising and Lost Planet: Extreme Condition only, Capcom later decided for their internal development divisions to adopt it as their default engine. As a result, the vast majority of their internally developed video games for the PlayStation 3 and Xbox 360 platforms were created on it, including four new titles and three remastered ports of past titles in the Resident Evil series. The visuals of the first games built with the engine were well received, and MT Framework has also won a CEDEC award.

Throughout the years MT Framework received various updates, most significant of which was a major revision called MT Framework 2.0, introduced with Lost Planet 2 in 2010. Additionally, two offshoots of the engine have been made; MT Framework Lite targets the Wii and PlayStation 3 consoles, and MT Framework Mobile powers games for the Nintendo 3DS, PlayStation Vita, Android and iOS.

As of 2014, Capcom's stance on the future of the engine is that while it will continue to be used to create games for the seventh generation of video game consoles, smartphones and handhelds. Panta Rhei and the RE Engine, which was used to develop Resident Evil 7: Biohazard, are intended to be MT Framework's successors for developing games for the eighth generation of video game consoles.

History

Background
Before the creation of MT Framework, Capcom's internal development teams were each using engines and tools of their own design, a process that was deemed inefficient. Thus, the decision to build an engine that would support the needs of all of Capcom's developers was made. At first MT Framework was being developed to be used in Dead Rising and Lost Planet: Extreme Condition only. Capcom evaluated the Unreal Engine 3 engine for adoption as their internal engine, but decided against it due to some performance limitations and difficulties of getting technical support from its American developer, Epic Games, in Japan. As such, the decision to further develop MT Framework and extend its internal use was made.

MT Framework 1.x
Development of MT Framework had begun in September 2004 based on the Onimusha 3 engine.  The engine was built to use PC development tools and initially target the Xbox 360 system because of its similarity to the PC platform. In 2004 the project had started by just one programmer but in the following years and as they added support for more platforms more people joined in. Because of its PC development tools, video games can be programmed first on the PC, and then adjusted to run on console hardware. MT framework supports multithreading techniques to take advantage of the multicore CPUs that are being used in the Xbox 360 and PlayStation 3 consoles, as well as modern PCs.

For Lost Planet: Extreme Condition and its use of MT Framework, Capcom highlighted the following features supported by the engine: a light motion blur effect called "2.5D motion blur" (based on the "Stupid OpenGL Shader Tricks" presentation by Simon Green at the Game Developers Conference 2003) is supported to help smooth 30 fps games; Light-Space Perspective Shadow Maps, a form of shadow mapping, is used for the rendering of the shadows and a technique called Percentage Closer Filtering to smooth them; normal mapping, HDR rendering, soft particles, variable amounts of MSAA, and a technique with which particles can be rendered at 1/4th of the full resolution for the benefit of performance; basic physics handling by the integrated Havok middleware, and a custom physics engine to handle character-local physics calculations such as cloth physics and inverse kinematics.

The first significant update to the engine was the release of the PC version of Lost Planet: Extreme Condition, which was the second PC game to support DirectX 10 and the first with a DirectX 10 demo. Ambient occlusion and parallax occlusion mapping support was added to the engine, and under DirectX 10 improved soft shadow rendering, and by the use of vertex shaders, less artifact-prone motion blur, fur shading and improved depth of field with a bokeh-like appearance. The two games on PC that followed Lost Planet: Extreme Condition - Devil May Cry 4 and Resident Evil 5 - also featured DirectX 10 support, but Capcom decided against using it to improve upon the visuals, thus making them look largely the same as when running under DirectX 9. However, Resident Evil 5 under DirectX 10, was the first video game to be presented fully in stereoscopic 3D, including all of its cutscenes, and the first to be rated as "3D Vision Ready" by Nvidia. Later re-releases of the two games on PC removed DirectX 10 support.

MT Framework 2.x
A major update to the engine called MT Framework 2.0 began development in January 2008 and made its debut with the release of Lost Planet 2 in 2010. According to Capcom, several parts of the engine were re-written from scratch and as a result it performs better on the PlayStation 3 hardware, compared to the previous version of the engine which was first built with the Xbox 360 in mind. Capcom highlighted the interactivity between characters and vegetation in Lost Planet 2 as one of the significant improvements made possible with the new engine, but also noted because the game began development on the previous version of the engine it doesn't fully represent the capabilities of the new iteration. Capcom further commented that MT Framework 2.0 is able to hide the specifics of the hardware and the supported shader models from programmers, enabling them to write more platform-agnostic code than before, and reducing their burden. In Capcom's 2011 annual report, it was confirmed that 80% of MT Framework's development process is common between the Xbox 360, PlayStation 3 and PC platforms, something which reduced development costs. Lastly, Capcom made possible for the first time for external contract studios that would partner with them, to use the engine. The first externally developed game to use MT Framework 2 was Marvel vs. Capcom 3: Fate of Two Worlds.

The PC version of Lost Planet 2 released some months after the console versions in 2010, added support for DirectX 11 features such as tessellation, displacement mapping and the use of DirectCompute for soft body simulation and wave simulation. Later MT Framework 2.0 games released on PC were DirectX 9 only.

Another significant update was made for Dragon's Dogma, released in 2012. Previous MT Framework games were "stage-based" with each stage divided by a loading screen. Because Dragon's Dogma'''s levels are tens to hundreds times larger than in previous MT titles, and the structure of the game is open world, the only way they could make it work on the engine, was by adapting it to be able to move in and out of memory portions of the game world, as needed. Another improvement is that the engine moved from using a forward renderer to a hybrid one that makes use of deferred lighting (also known as Light Pre-Pass). This made possible to support a 24 hour cycle and weather variation and an "infinite" number of lights. Other changes include support for real-time variation of a character model and FXAA. Building on top of Dragon's Dogma updated technology, Resident Evil 6 added SSAO, and improved hair rendering (based on the "Light Scattering from Human Hair Fibers" paper presented at SIGGRAPH 2003) along with facial expressions and eye movement. Monster Hunter: World, released in 2018, can output in HDR.

MT Framework Lite and MT Framework Mobile
In late October 2009, it was reported that Capcom was bringing MT Framework to Wii to reduce the development time and costs of developing Wii games. Sengoku BASARA 3 was confirmed as the first game running on MT Framework Lite, a special version of the engine targeting the Nintendo Wii and PlayStation 3 hardware. At E3 2010, Super Street Fighter IV: 3D Edition and Resident Evil: Revelations were announced as upcoming games for the Nintendo 3DS, and in late September 2010, the two games along with Resident Evil: The Mercenaries 3D and Mega Man Legends 3 were revealed to be running on MT Framework Mobile, a new version of the engine, based on MT Framework 2.0, specifically designed for the Nintendo 3DS. Capcom noted that thanks to MT Framework Mobile, Resident Evil: Revelations features a graphics rendering pipeline that is almost identical to that of Resident Evil 5, supporting HDR rendering, self shadowing, normal mapping, color correction, gamma correction, depth of field, motion blur and anti-aliasing on the Nintendo 3DS hardware. In late January 2011, Capcom demonstrated the intro of Lost Planet 2 running on MT Framework Mobile on the "Next Generation Portable", later renamed to PlayStation Vita. The Vita version of Ultimate Marvel vs. Capcom 3 was the first MT Framework Mobile game to be released on the hardware. MT Framework Mobile's support for iOS was later also announced, and the first game to use the engine on the iPhone was the port of Phoenix Wright: Ace Attorney - Dual Destinies, released in 2014.

Future
In a 2014 interview with Masaru Ijuin, an engineer behind MT Framework and the upcoming proprietary Capcom engine Panta Rhei, it was detailed that Capcom plans to move to the new engine starting with Deep Down but will continue the use of MT Framework for games developed for the seventh generation of consoles as well as MT Framework Mobile for handhelds and smartphones. He stated that "creators will have to start back at square one when they learn how [to] develop games using Panta Rhei" but the overall efficiency of development would increase more than it would if they had merely updated MT Framework. In June 2016, Resident Evil 7: Biohazard was announced and revealed to be running on a new proprietary engine by Capcom named RE Engine. RE Engine was said that it, too, will power multiple upcoming Capcom games. However Capcom chose MT Framework to build 2018's Monster Hunter: World, despite the game targeting PlayStation 4, Xbox One, and modern PCs, as they felt the existence of custom toolsets built into the engine from previous Monster Hunter'' titles, would benefit its development.

Games using MT Framework

Main engine (MTFW)

MT Framework Lite (MTFL) and MT Framework Mobile (MTFM)

References

2006 software
3D graphics software
Capcom
Video game engines